Nathaniel Brown (born May 20, 1988) is an American actor, director, and creative director.

Career 
Brown played the lead role in the 2009 Gaspar Noé thriller Enter the Void, alongside Paz De La Huerta.

As a director and creative director, Brown has worked widely across the commercial, fashion, and music worlds, collaborating prominently with artists Kanye West, Beyonce, Swedish House Mafia, and fashion houses John Elliot and En Noir.

References

External links 
 Official Site

American male film actors
Living people
1988 births
People from Hershey, Pennsylvania
Male actors from New York City